Amy Anzel is an American entrepreneur, actress, theatre producer and TV presenter.

Early life 
Anzel was born on April 7, 1973, in  Yonkers, New York which is her homeland, but currently resides in London, UK. In 1995, she graduated from Columbia University in the City of New York with a Bachelor of Arts degree in music. Amy's love for entertainment started at an early age when she began performing in local theatre productions. In an interview she stated she is married to Oliver but much about her husband has not yet been revealed.

Career
Anzel's career has included playing Mrs Zane in Kick-Ass 2 (2013), as well as acting in Nick Cannon Presents: Short Circuitz and Witchwise. Her theatre roles include Marty in the European tour of Grease, Cinderella with Jimmy Osmond, and the US tour of Annie. Anzel got to the semi-finals of the first season of The Bachelor in 2003. She also provided the singing voice of Ashley for the song I Can See Me in the Jem animated series.

As a producer, Anzel has worked on shows such as the Olivier award-winning Dreamgirls, the UK tour of Legally Blonde, Moby Dick, and UK premieres of The Life, Sideways and Casa Valentina. She also produced Happy Days: The Musical, which was depicted in the Channel 4 television series The Sound of Musicals.  This show was crowdfunded, raising £250,000 from 345 investors in just six weeks. Furthermore, it was the first commercial theatrical production to achieve full funding on Seedrs.

Anzel also works for the shopping channel QVC UK as a presenter.

Business 
Anzel is the chief executive officer of Hollywood Browzer Beauty, which she founded in 2017 and is  a multi award-winning beauty tools brand. The company specialises in dermaplaning, hair removal and exfoliation tools. The company is regularly featured on QVC shopping channels, with Amy Anzel presenting on the QVC UK channel. She was also the UK brand ambassador for the No! No! Hair removal system.

The Apprentice 
In 2022, Anzel was a candidate on the BBC television series, The Apprentice (British series 16). At the age of 48, she is the oldest candidate to appear on the show. She was fired in week 6, as part of team Infinity, where both teams were sent to Snowdonia, Wales and had to create a tourist experience. Lord Sugar told Amy: “You dodged the project management side of things, you’ve been here six weeks to show that you can do something, and you haven’t shown me you can do something. And so it is with regret that you’re fired. Thank you.” Speaking to Metro and other press after her firing, she said: "I will continue to focus on just growing and expanding my business. I want to be like, if everyone thinks of slimmers, they think of Spanx. "Well, I want everyone to think of [my company] Hollywood Browzer when they think of derma planing tools and brow shapers, that’s why I went in there and that’s what I was hoping to do next." "I feel like I’ve accomplished that and onwards and upwards and now I get to keep 100% of my company!, I don’t have to give away 50% for £250,000 – which, by the way, isn’t an amazing deal." According to a report in the Sun, Amy wasn't invited to the spin-off You're Hired, to be shown after the main show's final, after Lord Sugar had tweeted: "Amy didn’t sell she was so slow . Slower than broad band Wi-Fi in Cornwall @bbcapprentice" and "I think if I came up with a task of the life  and time of Amy Anzel she would still be sub team leader @bbcapprentice" Amy got an email [from Naked TV, who make the show] saying that invitations were issued at their discretion."

Filmography

References

Living people
American actresses
People from Yonkers, New York
The Apprentice (British TV series) candidates
Columbia College (New York) alumni
1973 births